René Quéré (26 May 1932 – 17 August 2021) was a French painter, illustrator, ceramist, and teacher.

Biography
During his studies, he frequented a Quimper faience company. Following two years of apprenticeship at the company, he dyed raw enamel unrolled by manganese dioxide.

Quéré spent his career as an independent artist, holding exhibitions in Brittany, Paris, Belgium, and Germany.

René Quéré died on 17 August 2021 at the age of 89.

Publications
Images de l'Iroise-Sein-Molène

Public collections

Belgium
Musée Merghelynck (Ypres)

France
Musée des Beaux-Arts de Brest
Briec Town Hall
Douarnenez Town Hall
Cosmos Foyer des PTT (Lannion)
Musée des beaux-arts de Morlaix
Plounévez-Lochrist Town Hall
 (Quimper)
Musée des Beaux-Arts de Quimper

Chapelle Saint-Jean

Exhibitions 

 1955: Saluden gallery in Quimper, earthenware and gouaches.

 1956: Salon des artistes de Cornouilles, Quimper museum.

 1960: Paris, House of Brittany.

 2002 (March-April): Gloux Gallery, Concarneau.

 From December 4, 2008, to January 3, 2009: Galerie Françoise Livinec, Paris, The Breton painter René Quéré in Paris.

References

1932 births
2021 deaths
20th-century French painters
French illustrators
20th-century French educators
People from Finistère
20th-century ceramists
20th-century French male artists
21st-century French painters
21st-century French educators
21st-century ceramists
21st-century French male artists
French ceramists
French male painters